The Sidri, also known as Sidrian Hunters, are a fictional race of extraterrestrial beings appearing in American comic books published by Marvel Comics. They are depicted as adversaries of the X-Men. Created by writer Chris Claremont and artist Dave Cockrum, they first appeared in Uncanny X-Men #154 (February 1982).

Physical characteristics and abilities
The Sidri look roughly like giant beetles, crabs or sting rays. The dorsal portion of their bodies resembles a shell and is dark purple. The underbelly is yellow. Sidri have six apparently digit-less limbs. Four limbs are large, purple, and located on the sides. Two are small, yellow and located near the front of the underbelly. Each Sidri has a single, large, red eye.

Sidrian's live in colonies and are so closely linked that they can combine into a "ship matrix." The matrix is a giant collective Sidri being roughly resembling a manta ray. The ship matrix also has a tail and two limbs with digits on the underbelly. This bioship form is capable of faster than light flight and survival in space.

Sidri are said to be a techno-organic race with adaptive capability, they can project an energy beam of unknown nature from a visor like aperture to stun their opponents but are particularly vulnerable to heat. They reproduce by laying eggs.

Encounters with the X-Men
The Sidri first encounter the X-Men when a group of Sidri bounty hunters followed Corsair to the X-Mansion. The Sidri attacked Corsair, Cyclops, and Storm and destroyed the mansion. The Sidri ship matrix then pursued the trio who had escaped in the Blackbird jet. Corsair killed the Sidri by igniting a petroleum storage facility.

Later, Kitty Pryde was attacked by a group of Sidri in a maintenance tunnel of the reconstructed X-Mansion's sub-basement. The sub-basement had survived the attack, and several Sidri had hid there to lay eggs. Colossus and Lockheed came to Kitty's aid, and the three defeated the Sidri. Lockheed destroyed thousands of Sidri eggs by burning them with his fire-breath and eating them.

An all female team of X-Men consisting of Jubilation Lee, Rachel Summers, Monet St. Croix, Ororo Munroe and Elizabeth Braddock ended up in a confrontation with an enclave of Sidrian Hunters while caring for the formerly comatose Shi'Ar imperial Deathbird. All while she was pursuing their employers; the Providian Order across star systems and towards Earth.

Another batch of Sidri hatchlings secretly takes over the now abandoned X-Mansion, where they surprise and capture Lady Mastermind when she comes looking for a portal to the X-Men's new domicile on Krakoa. However, when a team of X-Men is sent to investigate the presence of a mutant in the mansion, one of its members - Cypher - manages to establish a rapport with the Sidri, enabling the X-Men to free Lady Mastermind peacefully and permitting the Sidri to guard the portal.

Powers and abilities
The Sidri are an adaptive biomechanical species with the ability to survive in the vacuum of deep space. Possessing high resistance to extreme cold yet are vulnerable to intense heat, they can project force blasts or other forms of energy from their visor like eye, can grow additional natural body armor, and merge with other Sidri to double their size. They are of a collective consciousness with FTL-flight capacity.

References

Characters created by Chris Claremont
Characters created by Dave Cockrum